is a Japanese actress, voice actress and narrator. She was born and raised in Kanagawa Prefecture, Japan.

Filmography

Television animation

Original net animation

Original video animation

Theatrical animation

Video Games

Dubbing roles

Live-action

Animation

References

External links
 
Official agency profile 

1988 births
Living people
Japanese child actresses
Japanese musical theatre actresses
Japanese video game actresses
Japanese voice actresses
Kunitachi College of Music alumni
Voice actresses from Kanagawa Prefecture